RFA Tidepool (A76) was a  of the Royal Fleet Auxiliary.

Tidepool had a long and busy life in the fleet. The ship participated in both the Cod Wars and the Beira Patrol during the 1970s. In 1982 when the Falklands War broke out Tidepool was on its way to Chile to be disposed of. The ship was temporarily reclaimed by the United Kingdom and was finally handed over to the Chilean Navy on 13 August 1982 and renamed Almirante Jorge Montt.

References

 Chilean Navy website Almirante Jorge Montt

Tide-class replenishment oilers
Falklands War naval ships of the United Kingdom
1962 ships
Almirante Jorge Montt